Jonathan Brostoff (born September 25, 1983) is an American Democratic legislator from Milwaukee, Wisconsin. He represents the 3rd District of the Milwaukee Common Council, succeeding fellow Democrat Nik Kovac. Between 2015 and 2022, he represented the 19th district in the Wisconsin State Assembly.

Background 
Born in Milwaukee, Wisconsin, Brostoff is the son of Alan and Phyllis Brostoff. His father is a retired attorney, mediator and arbitrator; his mother, a social worker and businesswoman in the home health care industry. He  worked and volunteered at area non-profit organizations since the age of 14, and after high school did a stint with AmeriCorps. He attended the University of Wisconsin–Milwaukee, where he met and married Diana Vang-Brostoff and served as co-President of UWM's Campus Organization for Israel. He graduated in 2011 with a degree in political science, having worked as an aide for U.S. Senator Tom Harkin in Washington, D.C.

Brostoff worked as a legislative aide to Milwaukee County Supervisor Jason Haas, before becoming District Director for State Senator Chris Larson.

In 2022, Brostoff announced his intention to run for Milwaukee Common Council District 3's Aldermanic seat. Brostoff made the announcement after sitting Alderman Nik Kovac stepped down to assume the role of Budget and Management Director for the City of Milwaukee. He was elected to the position on November 8, 2022.

Electoral history

2014 
In 2014, Richards announced that he was running for Attorney General of Wisconsin, leaving the 19th Assembly District seat open. In a heavily contested race which heavy spending by multiple parties, Brostoff defeated Milwaukee County Board Chairwoman Marina Dimitrijevic (endorsed by Milwaukee's Mayor Tom Barrett and Congresswoman Gwen Moore), defense attorney Dan Adams (supported by Milwaukee County Executive Chris Abele), and labor lawyer Sara Geenen in the Democratic primary for this heavily-Democratic district. Brostoff received 3,065 (35%) to Dimitrijevic's 2,817 (32%), Adams' 2,020 (23%) and Geenen's 796 (9%). His opponent in the November 2014 general election, which includes the central campus of his alma mater the University of Wisconsin-Milwaukee, was Joe Klein of the United States Pirate Party. Brostoff was considered the favorite to win the seat. On November 4, 2014, Brostoff was elected to the Wisconsin State Assembly, with 18,054 (82.1%) of the vote, to Klein's 3,938 (17.9%).

2016, 2018 
Brostoff was unopposed in 2016 in both the primary and general elections; likewise in 2018.

2020 
He was unopposed in the 2020 primary election; his opponent in the November 2020 general election was Helmut Fritz, of the Republican Party. Brostoff was again re-elected with 27,552 votes (78.52%) to Fritz's 7,535 (21.48%) votes.

2022
In 2022, Brostoff ran unopposed for a seat representing the Third District of the Milwaukee Common Council replacing Nik Kovac who stepped down for a position Cavalier Johnson's mayoral administration. He was sworn into the Milwaukee Common Council on November 16, 2022.

Personal life
Brostoff lives on the East Side of Milwaukee with his wife and three children.

References

External links 
Brostoff's campaign website

1983 births
Living people
Politicians from Milwaukee
University of Wisconsin–Milwaukee alumni
Democratic Party members of the Wisconsin State Assembly
21st-century American politicians